Ethel Ann Mobley (née Flock; March 8, 1914 – June 26, 1984) of Fort Payne, Alabama was tied for the second female to drive in NASCAR history. Her brother Tim Flock said she was named after the gasoline her father used in his car.

"Flying Flocks"
Part of the racing Flock family, three of her brothers are considered to be NASCAR pioneers: Tim, Fonty and Bob Flock. She was married to Charlie Mobley, who fielded Tim's car in NASCAR's modified series.

Racing career
She raced in over 100 NASCAR Modified events in her career.

She had two Strictly Stock Series starts. She raced against her brothers at NASCAR's second event ever on July 10, 1949 at the Daytona Beach Road Course.

The event was the first to feature a brother and a sister, and the only NASCAR event to feature four siblings. Ethel beat Fonty and Bob by finishing eleventh (her career high), and Tim finished second. She made her only other career Cup start at Langhorne Speedway and finished 44th. Both events featured three female drivers (Sara Christian and Louise Smith).

In June 1949, she entered a racing competition in Florida, competing against 57 men drivers. She finished in 8th place.

On August 7, 1949, she became the first female racecar driver to compete against men in the state of Georgia when she entered a race at Central City Park Speedway in Macon, Georgia. She was rated as the top woman driver in the southeastern United States, having won many competitions in all-women races.

Motorsports career results

NASCAR
(key) (Bold – Pole position awarded by qualifying time. Italics – Pole position earned by points standings or practice time. * – Most laps led.)

Strictly Stock Series

References

External links
 
 Charles Tidwell's Glory Days

1914 births
1984 deaths
People from Fort Payne, Alabama
Racing drivers from Alabama
NASCAR drivers
American female racing drivers
Flock family